Romania is a sovereign state located in Southeastern Europe. Following rapid economic growth in the early 2000s, Romania has an economy predominantly based on services, and is a producer and net exporter of machines and electric energy, featuring companies like Automobile Dacia and OMV Petrom. It has been a member of NATO since 2004, and part of the European Union since 2007. A strong majority of the population identify themselves as Eastern Orthodox Christians and are native speakers of Romanian, a Romance language. The cultural history of Romania is often referred to when dealing with influential artists, musicians, inventors and sportspeople. For similar reasons, Romania has been the subject of notable tourist attractions.

For further information on the types of business entities in this country and their abbreviations, see "Business entities in Romania".

Notable firms 
This list includes notable companies with primary headquarters located in the country. The industry and sector follow the Industry Classification Benchmark taxonomy. Organizations which have ceased operations are included and noted as defunct.

See also 
 List of banks in Romania
 List of supermarket chains in Romania
 List of privatizations in Romania

References 

 
Romania